St Michael's Church, Farnsfield is a Grade II listed parish church in the Church of England in Farnsfield.

History

The church dates from the 15th century but was rebuilt between 1859 and 1860 by Thomas Chambers Hine and Robert Evans following a fire. Only a fragment of the tower from the 15th century building survives.

Organ
The organ is by James Jepson Binns. A specification of the organ can be found on the National Pipe Organ Register.

References

Church of England church buildings in Nottinghamshire
Grade II listed churches in Nottinghamshire
Churches completed in 1860